Melaleuca pungens is a shrub in the myrtle family Myrtaceae which is endemic to the south-west of Western Australia. It is very prickly, with a large number of spherical, yellow flower heads.

Description
New growth is silky. The leaves and flower stalks are covered with fine, soft hairs.

Taxonomy
Melaleuca pungens was first formally described in 1844 by Johannes Conrad Schauer in Plantae Preissianae. The specific epithet (pungens) is from the Latin pungens meaning "sharp", "acrid", "piercing" or "biting".

Distribution and habitat
Melaleuca pungens occurs in the south western corner of Western Australia in the Avon Wheatbelt, Esperance Plains, Geraldton Sandplains, Jarrah Forest and Mallee biogeographic regions. It grows in sandy soils, gravel, laterite and granite on hillsides and flats.

Cultivation
Melaleuca pungens adapts well to temperate areas with well-drained, acidic to neutral soils. It is frost hardy and can be grown readily from cuttings.

Conservation
This species is common throughout its range and is classified as "not threatened" by the Government of Western Australia Department of Parks and Wildlife.

References

pungens
Plants described in 1844
Endemic flora of Western Australia
Taxa named by Johannes Conrad Schauer